John Andrew Wilson (3 July 1916 – 30 July 1979) was a British wrestler. He competed in the men's Greco-Roman welterweight at the 1948 Summer Olympics.

References

External links
 

1916 births
1979 deaths
British male sport wrestlers
Olympic wrestlers of Great Britain
Wrestlers at the 1948 Summer Olympics
Place of birth missing